Denise Sherwood (née Branch) is a fictional character on the Lifetime television series Army Wives, portrayed by Catherine Bell.

Background and Family
Denise is a military brat and has at least two sisters, Beth and Suzanne. She mentioned having brothers but the exact number of siblings she has is never confirmed. At age 19 or 20, as a nursing student, she was doing her clinical hours at a hospital near Fort Bliss when she first met Frank Sherwood. Frank was brought in with a broken leg and arm after jumping off a radio tower as part of a bet. They subsequently married not long after and she never finished her nursing qualifications. In Season 6 she tells Claudia Joy that she and Frank have moved 14 times in the last 23 years.

The Sherwoods are close friends with the Holdens; Denise and Claudia Joy Holden are best friends while their children have known each since elementary school. They first met while stationed at Fort Carson.

Frank affectionately calls her "Dee". They have a son Jeremy, who was seventeen and about to graduate from high school when the show first premiered. Jeremy had a difficult relationship with both parents. He was frustrated and angry at his father and would take it out on Denise by physically hitting her. Towards the end of Season 1 he shocks them by enlisting in the Army, mainly out of guilt for hitting his mother and failing to meet his father's expectations. Frank disowned Jeremy after finding out that he had been hitting Denise while he was away in Iraq. During his leave he eventually made amends with Jeremy.

In Season 4 Denise discovers that she is pregnant after being told that she could no longer have children after Jeremy. She goes into labor during the season finale while on the phone with Jeremy, who was in Iraq on his second tour. Frank, who was also in Iraq, was able to witness the birth via webcam. Before he left for Iraq they agreed to name her Molly Victoria.

Storylines
Denise finished earning her nursing degree, and starts work as an RN at the post hospital. This causes a division between Denise and Frank, as he feels her start to change and become more independent. Denise and Frank filed for divorce, because Denise had an affair with a patient, Mac, while Frank was away in Iraq. Frank found out about the affair through another soldier and was sent home to deal with his marital affairs. Frank also had reasons to be suspicious, because when Dr. Chris Ferlinghetti (Getti) was still alive, Denise and Getti got extremely close, and after Getti's motorcycle wreck while he was in the hospital, Frank saw Denise kissing his hand.

Frank and Denise mutually agreed to divorce and separated briefly, with Frank moving out to the officers' quarters. They realized that they still loved each other and eventually dropped the divorce proceedings after reconnecting and working out their differences. Since Jeremy's enlistment and struggles with PTSD, the family have become closer.

During Season 3, Jeremy is deployed to Iraq, presumably near his father as they met on base. While there he lost a buddy from his platoon and witnessed the death of his best friend PFC Mark Rison. He returns from Iraq in the episode "Shrapnel and Alibis" and is shown to be suffering from posttraumatic stress disorder and survivor's guilt in subsequent episodes. In the season finale, the show ended with Denise and Frank returning home from Michael's promotion ceremony to hear a gunshot from inside the house. He had taken his father's gun and nearly committed suicide with it. Frank and Denise returned home in time to intervene and were forced to let the MPs take him and admit him to a psychiatric ward.

After Roxy has a miscarriage in Season 4, Denise finds out she's pregnant (this was due to the actress Catherine Bell becoming pregnant in real life). She tells Frank by giving him a box with a mobile in it when he's in bed. In "Army Strong", Denise finds out that they are expecting a girl. She and Frank plan to name their daughter Molly. In the season finale, Denise gives birth to Molly Victoria Sherwood.

In the Season 5 episode "Movement to Contact" Denise is introduced to Jeremy's fiancee SPC Tanya Gabriel, whom Jeremy had proposed to the previous season. Their first meeting was awkward as Tanya was extremely nervous about meeting her and Denise later tells Frank that she does not like Tanya. After some persuasion from Frank she gives Tanya a second chance. They soon become friendly, especially after Denise invites the other wives to help plan for the bridal shower. During the party Denise is paid a visit by the casualty notification officer and told of Jeremy's death. Jeremy had been killed in action during a gunfight while in Afghanistan. For the next several episodes she goes into mourning and neglects Frank while "obsessing" over Molly, much to Claudia Joy and Roland's concern. She and Frank find comfort after reading a letter Jeremy had written in the event of his death and are finally able to move on. Tanya becomes a surrogate daughter to them and Denise would check up on Tanya while the latter would help babysit Molly. She also helps Tanya move on from Jeremy's death and encourages her to attend the banquet in the season finale.

In season 6, Denise is badly injured in a hurricane and hallucinates a life where Jeremy wasn't killed and grew to a happy married man. She eventually awakens to care for Frank and their baby. When Claudia Joy becomes ill, Denise agrees to donate one of her kidneys to her friend. The two spend time at a beach cabin only to be held hostage by a crazed mind. Denise ends up shooting him dead to save Claudia Joy.

Career
Denise is an RN (registered nurse). She was a nurse when she and Frank met, but when they got married she put her career on hold to start and care for her family. She went back to get certified in the second season. Denise was fired from Mercer in the third season for having sexual affairs with a patient. After saving Claudia Joy Holden's life following a car accident, she was inspired to try getting certified as an emergency responder. She was an emergency responder for a little while then discovered that she was pregnant. Shortly after finding out that, she was moved to being a dispatcher for 9-1-1. After she had Molly and there being a change in administration at Mercer, Claudia Joy asked Joan if Denise could possibly get a job again at Mercer.  After Joan asks the administrator if they would look over Denise's file, they call her in and gave her a job as a nurse. She currently works at Mercer with Tanya.

Characterization
Catherine Bell said of her character: “The first season, she was more withdrawn and was being abused by her son, but now she has come out of her shell. She is such a strong woman now, especially after losing her son and getting through that experience and helping others. I think I share some of those strengths with her."

Reception
The Chicago Tribune called Catherine Bell who "uses her typical subtlety and grace to give an intriguing interior life to Denise Sherwood," one of the best things about the show with Kim Delaney who portrays Claudia Joy Holden while  Rob Owen of the Pittsburgh Post-Gazette found Denise and Claudia Joy "the most passive, least interesting characters".

References

External links
 Denise Sherwood at Lifetime

Army Wives characters
Fictional nurses
Fictional paramedics
Television characters introduced in 2007
American female characters in television